Gopal Apa Kamat (22 July 1917 – 2 May 1990) was an Indian politician, freedom fighter, journalist and lawyer from Goa. He was a former member of the Goa Legislative Assembly, representing the Sattari Assembly constituency from 1967 to 1972. He was also a former speaker of the Goa Legislative Assembly in the same term.

References

1917 births
1990 deaths
People from North Goa district
20th-century Indian politicians
Goa, Daman and Diu MLAs 1967–1972
Maharashtrawadi Gomantak Party politicians